Samantha Stosur defeated Serena Williams in the final, 6–2, 6–3 to win the women's singles tennis title at the 2011 US Open. It was her first and only major singles title. Stosur became the first Australian woman to win a major since Evonne Goolagong Cawley at the 1980 Wimbledon Championships, and the first to win the US Open since Margaret Court in 1973.

Kim Clijsters was the two-time reigning champion, but withdrew due to an abdominal injury.

This was the first time in the tournament's history where no American players were among the top ten seeds.

This was the first US Open main draw appearance for 2017 champion Sloane Stephens, who lost in the third round to Ana Ivanovic.

Seeds

Qualifying

Main draw

Finals

Top half

Section 1

Section 2

Section 3

Section 4

Bottom half

Section 5

Section 6

Section 7

Section 8

Championship match statistics

References

External links
Official site
 Main Draw
 Schedule of Play
2011 US Open – Women's draws and results at the International Tennis Federation

2011 US Open (tennis)
US Open (tennis) by year – Women's singles
2011 in women's tennis
2011 in American women's sports